Robert Antell Sims Jr. (October 9, 1938 – March 21, 2006) was an American professional basketball player in both the National Basketball Association (NBA) and American Basketball Association (ABA). Sims was selected in the 1960 NBA Draft by the St. Louis Hawks after a collegiate career at Pepperdine University. In his NBA/ABA career, Sims averaged 7.7 points, 2.7 rebounds and 2.3 assists per game.

References

1938 births
2006 deaths
Amateur Athletic Union men's basketball players
American men's basketball players
Anaheim Amigos players
Basketball players from Los Angeles
Los Angeles Lakers players
Pepperdine Waves men's basketball players
Shooting guards
St. Louis Hawks draft picks
St. Louis Hawks players